North West Thunder, commonly referred to as Thunder, are a women's cricket team that represent Lancashire and North West England, one of eight regional hubs in English domestic women's cricket. They play their home matches at various grounds, including Old Trafford Cricket Ground. They are captained by Eleanor Threlkeld and coached by Paul Shaw. The team carries over many elements of the WCSL team Lancashire Thunder, but are now partnered with Lancashire, Cheshire and Cumbria.

History
In 2020, women's cricket in England was restructured, creating eight new 'regional hub' teams, with the intention of playing both 50-over and 20-over cricket. North West Thunder were one of the sides created under this structure, effectively replacing the Women's Cricket Super League team Lancashire Thunder and representing Lancashire and North West England, partnering with Lancashire, Cheshire and Cumbria. The side was to be captained by Alex Hartley and coached by Paul Shaw. Due to the COVID-19 pandemic, the 2020 season was truncated, and only 50-over cricket was played, in the Rachael Heyhoe Flint Trophy. North West Thunder finished third in the North Group of the competition, winning two of their six matches. At the end of the season, five Thunder players were given full-time domestic contracts, the first of their kind in England: Alex Hartley, Georgie Boyce, Emma Lamb, Eleanor Threlkeld and Hannah Jones.

The following season, 2021, North West Thunder competed in both the Rachael Heyhoe Flint Trophy and the newly-formed Twenty20 competition, the Charlotte Edwards Cup. In the Charlotte Edwards Cup the side finished third in their group, winning two of their six matches, as well as their away match against Sunrisers ending in a tie. Thunder batter Emma Lamb hit the first Charlotte Edwards Cup century in the reverse fixture against Sunrisers, as her side made the highest team score of the tournament, 186/1. In the Rachael Heyhoe Flint Trophy, the team finished seventh in the group of eight, winning three of their seven matches. North West Thunder bowler Hannah Jones was the joint-second highest wicket-taker in the tournament, with 14 wickets.

Ahead of the 2022 season, Hartley stood down as captain of the side. Eleanor Threlkeld was named as her replacement. The side finished third in their group in the Charlotte Edwards Cup that season, winning two of their six matches. The side finished seventh in the group of eight in the Rachael Heyhoe Flint Trophy.

Home grounds

Players

Current squad
As per 2022 season.
 No. denotes the player's squad number, as worn on the back of their shirt.
  denotes players with international caps.

Academy
The North West Thunder Academy team plays against other regional academies in friendly and festival matches across various formats. The Academy selects players from across the North West region, and includes some players who are also in the first team squad. Players in the 2022 Academy are listed below:

Overseas players
  Piepa Cleary – Australia (2021)
  Deandra Dottin – West Indies (2022)

Coaching staff

 Head Coach: Paul Shaw
 Regional Director: David Thorley
 Senior Regional Talent Manager: Jen Barden

As of the 2022 season.

Seasons

Rachael Heyhoe Flint Trophy

Charlotte Edwards Cup

Statistics

Rachael Heyhoe Flint Trophy

 Abandoned matches are counted as NR (no result)
 Win or loss by super over or boundary count are counted as tied.

Charlotte Edwards Cup

 Abandoned matches are counted as NR (no result)
 Win or loss by super over or boundary count are counted as tied.

Records

Rachael Heyhoe Flint Trophy
Highest team total: 291/8, v Western Storm on 29 May 2021.
Lowest (completed) team total: 110 v Southern Vipers on 10 September 2021.
Highest individual score: 121, Emma Lamb v Western Storm on 29 May 2021.
Best individual bowling analysis: 6/24, Alex Hartley v South East Stars on 16 July 2022.
Most runs: 507 runs in 19 matches, Eleanor Threlkeld.
Most wickets: 31 wickets in 17 matches, Alex Hartley.

Charlotte Edwards Cup
Highest team total: 186/1, v Sunrisers on 9 July 2021.
Lowest (completed) team total: 90/9 v Northern Diamonds on 30 August 2021.
Highest individual score: 111*, Emma Lamb v Sunrisers on 9 July 2021.
Best individual bowling analysis: 5/15, Sophie Ecclestone v Lightning on 3 June 2022.
Most runs: 409 runs in 10 matches, Emma Lamb.
Most wickets: 13 wickets in 10 matches, Emma Lamb and 13 wickets in 12 matches, Hannah Jones.

See also
 Cheshire Women cricket team
 Cumbria Women cricket team
 Lancashire Women cricket team
 Lancashire Thunder

References

 
2020 establishments in England
Lancashire County Cricket Club
Cricket in Lancashire
Cricket in Merseyside
Cricket clubs established in 2020
English Domestic Women's Cricket Regional Hub teams